James Vincent Castiglia (September 30, 1918 – December 26, 2007) was an American football fullback in the National Football League for the Washington Redskins and the Philadelphia Eagles.  He also played for the Baltimore Colts of the All-America Football Conference.  In 1941 he played his first season with the Eagles, carrying the ball 60 times for 183 yards.

In 1942 Castiglia left the NFL to play professional baseball in the major leagues.  Castiglia played for the Philadelphia Athletics, and is recorded as a catcher, but was mostly used as a pinch-hitter, catching in just three games.  He is one of many ballplayers who only appeared in the major leagues during World War II.  Though he only played 16 games, he hit extremely well, going 7-for-18, a .389 batting average.  He had two runs batted in and scored two runs.   During his season, the 23-year-old rookie, a graduate of Georgetown University, stood 5'11" and weighed 200 lbs.

Following World War II, Castiglia returned to the NFL to play the 1945 and 1946 seasons with the Eagles.  In 1947, he played two games with the Colts before moving to the Redskins.  Castiglia retired from the NFL following the 1948 season.

Castiglia died December 26, 2007, in Rockville, Maryland. He is buried in Gate of Heaven Cemetery in Aspen Hill, Maryland.

References

External links

1918 births
2007 deaths
Burials at Gate of Heaven Cemetery (Silver Spring, Maryland)
Sportspeople from Passaic, New Jersey
Georgetown Hoyas football players
American football running backs
United States Army personnel of World War II
Philadelphia Eagles players
Baltimore Colts (1947–1950) players
Washington Redskins players
Major League Baseball catchers
Baseball players from New Jersey
Philadelphia Athletics players
Passaic High School alumni
Military personnel from New Jersey